Karina Olkhovik (born 17 June 2000) is a Belarusian professional footballer who plays as a forward for Italian Serie A club US Sassoulo and the Belarus national team.

Club Career
She began her football career in the Lida Youth. Soon she moved to RGUOR. In the period from 2012 to 2015 she was engaged in youth teams. In 2016, she began to perform at the adult level. She played her debut match on April 17, 2016 in a match against the Slavyanka club, where she also scored with her debut goal. She was repeatedly recognized as the top scorer of the club and the Premier League. In the 2018 season, she scored 42 goals, which was her best result in her football career. In January 2020, she left the club.

At the beginning of 2020, the football player joined the newly created Dynamo-BSUPC club. In the debut match on April 30, 2020 against the ABFF team, she scored with a brace. Immediately became one of the key players and scorers of the club. Together with the club in the debut season, she became the winner of the Higher League and the owner of the Cup of Belarus. A year later, she was able to repeat the result, this time with a victory for the Belarusian Super Cup. In January 2022, she left the Minsk club.

In January 2022, she moved to the Italian club Chievo. Represented the club for six months, scoring 3 goals in 5 matches. Then she joined the ranks of Sassuolo. She made her debut for the club on September 12, 2022 in a match against Parma. In November 2022, she received the award of the Best Belarusian Football Player of the Year. In January 2023, on a loan agreement, she moved to the Italian club Cesena.

International career 
In 2016, she began to play for the Under-17 national team of Belarus. In 2017, she received a call-up to the Under-19 team.

In 2019, she received a call to the senior national team of Belarus. She has been capped for the Belarus national team, appearing for the team during the 2019 FIFA World Cup qualifying cycle.

International goals

References

External links
 
 
 

2000 births
Living people
People from Dzyatlava
Sportspeople from Grodno Region
Belarusian women's footballers
Women's association football forwards
U.S. Sassuolo Calcio (women) players
Serie A (women's football) players
Belarus women's international footballers
Belarusian expatriate sportspeople in Italy
Expatriate women's footballers in Italy